Sławęcin  is a village in the administrative district of Gmina Chojnice, within Chojnice County, Pomeranian Voivodeship, in northern Poland. It is located within the historic region of Pomerania.

The village has a population of 519.

Sławęcin was a royal village of the Polish Crown, administratively located in the Tuchola County in the Pomeranian Voivodeship.

Notable people
  (1880–1958), Polish independence activist during the partition period

References

Villages in Chojnice County